Bombus bellardii is a species of cuckoo bumblebee.

Synonyms (Heterotypic)
 Psithyrus pieli Maa, 1948
 Psithyrus tajushanensis Pittioni, 1949

References

 Williams, P.H. 1998: An annotated checklist of bumble bees with an analysis of patterns of description (Hymenoptera: Apidae, Bombini). Bulletin of the Natural History Museum, entomology series, 67(1): 79–152. BHL [See p. 105]

Bumblebees
Insects described in 1892